Juozas Bagdonas (born 21 June 1968) is a Lithuanian rower. He competed at the 1992 Summer Olympics and the 1996 Summer Olympics.

References

1968 births
Living people
Lithuanian male rowers
Olympic rowers of Lithuania
Rowers at the 1992 Summer Olympics
Rowers at the 1996 Summer Olympics
People from Telšiai